Kiryl Vyarheychyk (born 23 August 1991) is a Belarusian professional footballer who plays for Slutsk.

Honours
Shakhtyor Soligorsk
Belarusian Cup winner: 2013–14

Personal life
He is a son of the coach and former Belarus international player Yury Vyarheychyk.

References

External links

1991 births
Living people
Footballers from Minsk
Belarusian footballers
Association football midfielders
FC Shakhtyor Soligorsk players
FC Torpedo-BelAZ Zhodino players
FC Dynamo Brest players
FC Neman Grodno players
FC Vitebsk players
FC Dinamo Minsk players
FC Slutsk players